Dun Skeig is an oval Iron Age dun (fort) complex which is perched atop a rocky outcropping about  above sea level overlooking West Loch Tarbert in Kintyre, Argyll and Bute, Scotland, about  northwest of the village of Clachan.

The dun site includes a collection of prehistoric buildings and evidence of human habitation. Most notable of the buildings on the site are a rocky Iron Age fort and a vitrified fort that has been grown over with ground vegetation.

The moderately challenging climb to the peak and the views of the surrounding landscape that the vantage point offers make it clear why the site was selected as a defensive position.

Other nearby prehistoric sites
Other nearby sites on the Kintyre Peninsula include:
 Avinagillan Standing Stone 
 Ballochroy Standing Stones
 Corriechrevie Cairn.

References
 Treasures of Britain (1968) Drive Publications, Automobile Association, p. 171 
 Historic Environment Scotland, Canmore Database

Buildings and structures in Argyll and Bute
Kintyre
Hill forts in Scotland
Scheduled monuments in Scotland